"The Bakery" is a song by American recording artist Melanie Martinez, released as the only single from her EP After School, and accompanied by a music video.

Background 
On July 25, 2020, Melanie revealed during an interview with Brazilian channel "Multishow" that the track was produced by Blake Slatkin. On September 22, 2020, Melanie posted a snippet of the song on TikTok, announcing that it would be released on September 25. On September 25, 2020, Melanie posted a snippet of the music video on her Instagram, announcing that the video, alongside the rest of the EP, would be released at 12:00AM EST. A photo from the music video was also revealed on an Instagram story.

Theme 
'The Bakery' is a song about Martinez unenthusiastically working at a bakery during high school because she needed to make money to invest into her art and her music.

Charts

Release history

Notes

References 

2020 songs
Melanie Martinez songs
Songs written by Melanie Martinez
Media about cakes